McCanless is a Scottish surname. Notable people with the surname include:

 Hix McCanless, American architect, surveyor, and civil engineer
 Jim McCanless (born 1936), American football player

Surnames of Scottish origin